Jalaquduq (1976–2015 Oxunboboev or Akhunbabayev, before 1976 Soʻfiqishloq or Sufi-Kishlak) is a city in Andijan Region, Uzbekistan. It is the administrative center of Jalaquduq District. Its population was 11,043 in 1989, and 24,000 in 2016.

References

Populated places in Andijan Region
Cities in Uzbekistan